The Inherited Repression is the fifth studio album by Australian technical death metal band Psycroptic. It was released in North America on 7 February 2012 and on 10 February 2012 by Nuclear Blast Records.

Track listing

Personnel
Psycroptic
 Cameron Grant - bass
 David Haley - drums
 Joe Haley -guitars
 Jason Peppiatt - vocals

Production and artwork
 Joe Haley - production, engineering, mixing
 Rain Song Design - cover artwork
 Alan Douches - mastering

References

External links
 iTunes - Music - The Inherited Repression by Psycroptic

2012 albums
Psycroptic albums
Century Media Records albums